Grounding is a general discipline technique which is restriction of children at home from going out. During this time period, any positive reinforcement is taken away and other privileges, such as but not limited to using the Internet, playing video games, or watching television, are often revoked.

Grounding is used as an alternative to physical discipline, e.g., spanking, for behavior management in the home. According to a 2000 review on child outcomes, "Grounding has been replicated as a more effective disciplinary alternative than spanking with teenagers." Grounding can backfire if the type and duration of restrictions are disproportionately severe for the behavior meant to be corrected, or if the restrictions are too difficult for the parent to enforce due to resistance.

Origin 
This term was used initially in aviation: when a pilot is prevented from flying an aircraft due to misconduct, illness, technical issues with the aircraft, or other reasons, the pilot is "grounded" – that is, literally confined to the ground.

References 

Punishments
Youth rights
Children's rights

de:Stubenarrest